The buff-necked woodpecker (Meiglyptes tukki) is a species of bird in the family Picidae.
It is found in Brunei, Indonesia, Malaysia, Myanmar, Singapore, and Thailand.
Its natural habitats are subtropical or tropical moist lowland forests and subtropical or tropical swamps. It is threatened by habitat loss.

References

buff-necked woodpecker
Birds of Malesia
buff-necked woodpecker
Taxonomy articles created by Polbot